The Tin Duties Act 1838 (also known as the Coinage Abolition Act) is an Act of the Parliament of the United Kingdom (citation 1 & 2 Vict c. 120) which abolished the tin coinage taxation system of the tin mines in Devon and Cornwall, and authorized instead an annual payment to the Duke of Cornwall to compensate for this loss of revenue. The Act also compensated the officers who collected the tax. Until that time Cornwall paid 4 shillings per hundredweight of coined tin, Devon 1 shilling d.

This compensation of £16,216 was received by successive Dukes until 1983, when the Act was repealed by the Miscellaneous Financial Provisions Act 1983. This repeal makes it theoretically legal for a separate Cornish tax to be re-instituted by the Duke, under the provisions of the Charter of the Duchy of Cornwall, although any revenue gained in this way would not be personal income of the Duke, but rather be understood as revenue of the Duchy as a territorial entity (see Constitutional status of Cornwall).

Overpayment invoice
According to their website, on 15 May 2000, the Revived Cornish Stannary Parliament sent an invoice to the Duchy of Cornwall for the sum of £20,067,900,000 claiming recovery of alleged overcharged taxation on tin production by the Duchy of Cornwall. The claim was based on the higher taxation (or "coinage") rates levied on Cornish tin compared to that mined in Devon. In order to calculate the bill, historical production figures were derived from a privately-published undergraduate thesis of 1908. The CSP document claims a racial motive for overcharging Celtic Cornwall.

See also

Mining in Cornwall and Devon

References 

1838 in British law
United Kingdom Acts of Parliament 1838
History of Cornwall
History of Devon
Tin mining
19th century in Cornwall
19th century in Devon